Andy (1987 – October 19, 1991) was a goose hatched without feet. He was well known for wearing sneakers to help him stand and walk. He was killed in 1991 by an unnamed perpetrator.

Background
The goose hatched in 1987 without feet and lived on a farm in Harvard, Nebraska. When Andy was two years old, Gene Fleming from nearby Hastings became aware of the plight of the bird. Fleming was an inventor and member of a local charity for disabled children, and he thought he would be able to help. Fleming took care of Andy and his mate, Polly, and moved them to his farm in Hastings. Fleming's granddaughter, Jessica, named him after a girl she got into a fight with in junior high school. 

Initial failed attempts at providing Andy with more mobility included a skateboard-like prosthesis. Fleming then fitted Andy with specially adapted baby-sized shoes, and he successfully taught the bird to walk with them. Subsequently, Andy caught the attention of the media and Nike, which offered a lifetime deal to supply shoes for Andy – the bird wore out a pair of shoes in about one month. At one point, Andy and Gene appeared on The Tonight Show with Johnny Carson. 

Andy became a role model, especially for disabled children. With his shoes, Andy was able to walk, swim, and fly; his owners hoped Andy's mobility would give hope to people with disabilities.

On October 19, 1991, Andy disappeared, and a day later he was found dead in a local park with his head and wings removed. The local community collected  as a reward to apprehend the killer; however, the perpetrator could not be identified. According to former Chamber of Commerce president Don Reynolds, police were able to identify the killer but did not reveal their identity to the public.

See also
List of individual birds

References

1987 animal births
1991 animal deaths
Geese
Animal cruelty incidents
Unsolved crimes in the United States
Individual waterfowl
Individual animals in the United States
October 1991 crimes
October 1991 events in the United States